The 2008–09 Welsh Premier League was the 17th season of the Welsh Premier League since its establishment in 1992 as the League of Wales. It began on 15 August 2008 and ended on 25 April 2009. Llanelli were the defending champions.

Team changes from 2007–08
Prestatyn Town were promoted from the Cymru Alliance and played in the top division for the first time in their history. Caersws survived relegation after none of the top two teams in the divisions below could meet ground regulations.

Overview

League table

Results

Top goalscorers
Source: welsh-premier.com

31 goals
  Rhys Griffiths (Llanelli AFC)

25 goals
  Martin Rose (Port Talbot Town)

24 goals
  Marc Lloyd-Williams(Porthmadog FC)

20 goals
  Chris Sharp (Bangor City)
  Neil Roberts (Rhyl FC)
  Jack Christopher (Haverfordwest County)

18 goals
  John Toner (The New Saints)

15 goals
  Steve Rogers (Welshpool Town)
  Paul Roberts (Welshpool Town)

14 goals
  Nick Woodrow (Haverfordwest County)

Awards

Monthly awards

Annual awards

Team of the season

Source:

References

External links
 Welsh Premier League Football

2008-09
1